Canadian singer, musician, and actor Henry Lau debuted in 2005 as a member of Super Junior, then in 2008 he was moved with fellow member Zhoumi to be part of Super Junior-M. He was cast in the 2013 drama film Final Recipe in his acting debut, playing the male lead opposite Michelle Yeoh. In 2015, he played a supporting role in the South Korean drama Oh My Venus. In 2018, he shot two films back-to-back, the Chinese action-fantasy film Double World and his first American film A Dog's Journey; the films were released in 2020 and 2019 respectively. In 2021, he played a main role in the second season of Dramaworld.

Since gaining popularity on television with the 2014 series Real Man, Henry has appeared in numerous Korean and Chinese variety shows. His notable work include I Live Alone, Begin Again, Back to Field, and Super-Vocal.

Film

Television

As an actor

As himself

Web series

Radio show

Music videos

Promotional MVs

References

Lau, Henry